In the Name of the People is a 1974 West German documentary film directed by Ottokar Runze. It was entered into the 24th Berlin International Film Festival where it won the Silver Bear.

Cast
 Gerd Siekmann as Richter (Judge)
 Heinz-Dietrich Stark as Anstaltsleiter (Head of Prison)
 Hajo Wandschneider as Rechtsanwalt (Lawyer)

References

External links 
 

1974 films
1974 documentary films
West German films
1970s German-language films
German documentary films
Films directed by Ottokar Runze
1970s German films